Dysoxylum brachybotrys is a tree in the family Meliaceae. The specific epithet  is from the Greek meaning "short bunch", referring to the inflorescence.

Description
The flowers are cream-coloured.

Distribution and habitat
Dysoxylum brachybotrys is found in Borneo and the Philippines. Its habitat is forests from sea-level to  altitude.

References

brachybotrys
Trees of Borneo
Trees of the Philippines
Plants described in 1925